Henry & June is a 1990 American biographical drama film directed by Philip Kaufman, and starring Fred Ward, Uma Thurman, and Maria de Medeiros. It is loosely based on the posthumously published 1986 Anaïs Nin book of the same name, and tells the story of Nin's relationship with Henry Miller and his wife, June.

The film was nominated for Best Cinematography at the 63rd Academy Awards.

It was the first film to be given an NC-17 rating by the MPAA.

Plot
In 1931 in Paris, France, Anaïs Nin is in a stable relationship with her husband Hugo, but longs for more out of life. When Nin first meets Henry Miller, he is working on his first novel. Nin is drawn to Miller and his wife June, as well as their bohemian lifestyle. Nin becomes involved in the couple's tormented relationship, having an affair with Miller and also pursuing June. Ultimately, Nin helps Miller to publish his novel Tropic of Cancer, but catalyzes the Millers' separation, while she returns to Hugo.

Cast

 Fred Ward as Henry Miller
 Uma Thurman as June Miller
 Maria de Medeiros as Anaïs Nin
 Richard E. Grant as Hugo
 Kevin Spacey as Richard Osborn
 Jean-Philippe Écoffey as Eduardo Sanchez (credit spelled as Ecoffey)
 Gary Oldman as Pop
 Artus de Penguern as Brassaï
 Liz Hasse as Jean
 Brigitte Lahaie as Henry's prostitute
 Féodor Atkine as Francisco Miralles Arnau

Soundtrack
The soundtrack was arranged by Mark Adler, consisting of period popular songs.
 Jean Lenoir, "Parlez-moi d'amour" (Lucienne Boyer)
 Claude Debussy, Six épigraphes antiques: Pour l'égyptienne (Ensemble Musical de Paris)
 Francis Poulenc, "Les chemins de l'amour" (Ransom Wilson and Christopher O'Riley)
 Debussy, Petite Suite: "Ballet" (Aloys and Alfons Kontarsky)
 Harry Warren, "I Found a Million Dollar Baby" (Bing Crosby)
 Erik Satie, "Gnossienne No. 3" (Pascal Rogé)
 Satie, "Je te veux" (Jean-Pierre Armengaud)
 Debussy, "Sonata for Violin and Piano" (first movement) (Kyung-wha Chung and Radu Lupu)
 Frédéric Chopin,  Nocturne No. 1 in C Major [sic] (Paul Crossley)
 Georges Auric, "Sous les toits de Paris" (Rene Nazels)
 Jacques Larmanjat, lyrics by Francis Carco, "Le doux caboulot" (Annie Fratellini)
 Debussy, "La plus que lente" (Josef Suk)
 "Je m'ennuie" (Mark Adler)
 "Coralia" (Mark Adler)
 Irving Mills, "St. James Infirmary Blues" (Mark Adler)
 Francisco Tárrega, "Gran Vals" (Francisco Tárrega)
 Joaquin Nin-Culmell, "Basque Song" (Joaquin Nin-Culmell)
 Vincent Scotto, lyrics by George Koger and H. Vama, "J'ai deux amours" (Josephine Baker)

Reception

Box office
Henry & June grossed $11,567,449 in the domestic market.

Critical reception
The film received mixed reviews from critics. Owen Gleiberman of Entertainment Weekly gave the film a B−, but felt that, "Kaufman, trying to deepen the erotic explorations of Unbearable Lightness, ends up with a triangle movie that’s watchable but also arty and rather stilted. The biggest disappointment of the film is that, after all the ratings brouhaha, it’s not very sexy." Janet Maslin of The New York Times noted the film's efforts to present sex in a more artistic, highbrow manner, remarking, "The film's sex scenes, photographed delicately by Philippe Rousselot and directed with great intensity by Mr. Kaufman, are particularly lofty. These sequences, often tinged with symbolism (a hand playing a guitar juxtaposed with a hand on a woman's breast), tend to be self-consciously bold," but felt the film lacked daring.

The film has a 60% approval rating on review aggregate Rotten Tomatoes based on 25 reviews, with an average rating of 6.1/10. The site's consensus reads, "Henry & June celebrates sensuality and passion, though the portentous filmmaking drags it down by a large degree".

References

External links

1990 films
1990 drama films
1990s English-language films
1990s erotic drama films
1990 LGBT-related films
American biographical drama films
American erotic drama films
American erotic romance films
American independent films
American LGBT-related films
Biographical films about LGBT people
Biographical films about writers
Female bisexuality in film
Fictional married couples
Films about sexuality
Films based on biographies
Films based on diaries
Film controversies
Films directed by Philip Kaufman
Films set in the 1930s
Films set in France
Films shot in France
Henry Miller
Lesbian-related films
LGBT-related controversies in film
Rating controversies in film
Universal Pictures films
1990s American films
1990 independent films
English-language drama films